Le Samyn is an annual single-day road bicycle race in Belgium, held usually in late February or early March. The event was created in 1968 as Grand Prix de Fayt-le-Franc, named after the former municipality where it started and finished. In 1970 it was renamed Grand Prix José Samyn as a tribute to José Samyn, the race's first winner who died in a race accident in 1969. Johan Capiot holds the record with three wins.

History
Since 2005, the race is included in the UCI Europe Tour as a 1.1 event. It is the first race of the season in Wallonia, held on the Tuesday after its Flemish counterpart, Omloop Het Nieuwsblad. The race is run entirely in the province of Hainaut, starting in Quaregnon and finishing in Dour. During the course, 16 sectors of cobbled roads are traversed, prompting Belgian media to call it The Little Paris–Roubaix.

The 2005 edition was cancelled because snow had made the roads too dangerous.

Since 2012, a women's edition of the race, named Le Samyn des Dames, is held on the same day as the men's race.

Winners

Men's race

Multiple winners

Wins by country

Women's race

Source

References

External links
  

UCI Europe Tour races
Recurring sporting events established in 1968
1968 establishments in Belgium
Cycle races in Belgium
Le Samyn des Dames
Women's road bicycle races